Pine Lake Park is an unincorporated community and census-designated place (CDP) located within Manchester Township, in Ocean County, New Jersey, United States. Until the 2000 Census, the CDP had been part of the Leisure Village West-Pine Lake Park CDP, which was split for the 2010 enumeration into separate CDPs for Leisure Village West and Pine Lake Park. As of the 2010 United States Census, the CDP's population was 8,707.

Geography
According to the United States Census Bureau, the CDP had a total area of 2.570 square miles (6.657 km2), all of which was land.

Demographics

Census 2010

References

Census-designated places in Ocean County, New Jersey
Manchester Township, New Jersey
Populated places in the Pine Barrens (New Jersey)